The 5+2 format, also known as the 5+2 talks, the 5+2 negotiations and the 5+2 process, is a diplomatic negotiation platform aimed at finding a solution to the Transnistria conflict between Moldova and the unrecognized state of Transnistria. It is composed of the latter two, which are designated as "parties to the conflict", and Russia, Ukraine and the Organization for Security and Co-operation in Europe (OSCE), "mediators" of the negotiations. The European Union (EU) and the United States act as "observers". The inclusion of Romania into the 5+2 format has been proposed.

The 5+2 format started in 2005, but due to the notice sent by Ukraine to the European Union Border Assistance Mission to Moldova and Ukraine (EUBAM) regarding the great amount of Transnistrian smuggling on Ukrainian territory, Transnistria and Russia suspended formal negotiations in 2006, with them only being formally resumed in 2012. In 2022, the 5+2 format was frozen again due to the 2022 Russian invasion of Ukraine, as both Russia and Ukraine are members of the format.

See also
 1997 Moscow memorandum
 1999 Istanbul summit
 2003 Kozak memorandum
 2005 Yushchenko Plan
 Berlin Plus package

References

Transnistria conflict
2005 establishments in Moldova
2005 in Transnistria
Peace processes
Politics of Moldova
Politics of Transnistria
Organization for Security and Co-operation in Europe
Moldova–Romania relations
Moldova–Russia relations
Moldova–Ukraine relations
Moldova–United States relations
Russia–Transnistria relations
Russia–Ukraine relations
Russia–United States relations
Transnistria–Ukraine relations
Transnistria–United States relations